The Progressive Democratic Alliance (PDA) was a centrist political party in British Columbia, Canada founded by Gordon Wilson, Member of the Legislative Assembly (MLA) for Powell River—Sunshine Coast.

Wilson, previously the leader of the British Columbia Liberal Party, led that party through a breakthrough in the provincial election of 1991, in which they rose from no parliamentary representation to official opposition status. He was unable to hold his caucus together, however, and was forced to call a leadership convention following revelations about his personal relationship with another member of the small Liberal caucus, Judi Tyabji, MLA for Okanagan East. Tyabji and Wilson were both married to others at the time; they subsequently divorced and married each other. Many in the Liberal Party believed that their relationship created at least the potential for a serious conflict of interest.

After losing the leadership challenge to Gordon Campbell, who in turn led the party to victory in the 2001 provincial election, Wilson and Tyabji left the party to establish the Progressive Democratic Alliance on December 5, 1993.

In the subsequent June 26, 1996 general election, Wilson retained his seat, while all 65 other PDA candidates, including Tyabji, were defeated. The party won a total of 90,797 votes, or 5.74% of the popular vote.

The PDA was disbanded by Wilson in 1997 when he joined the ruling New Democratic Party of British Columbia to become a member of Cabinet. He later ran for the provincial NDP leadership, but lost to Ujjal Dosanjh. He lost his legislative seat in the 2001 provincial election.

In 2004, former party activists attempted to resuscitate the PDA. Finding financial obstacles, they instead formed the British Columbia Democratic Alliance, billing it as a successor organization.

References

Further reading

See also
 List of Canadian political parties

Defunct political parties in Canada
Political parties disestablished in 1997
Political parties established in 1993
Provincial political parties in British Columbia
1993 establishments in British Columbia
1997 disestablishments in British Columbia